Wilsonia is a genus of perennial subshrubs in the family Convolvulaceae. The genus is endemic to Australia, occurring in coastal saltmarshes and occasionally in inland saline areas.

Taxonomy
The genus was first formally described in 1810 by Robert Brown in Prodromus Florae Novae Hollandiae. The name honours John Wilson, author of A Synopsis of British Plants.

Species
The following species are recognised in the genus Wilsonia:

Wilsonia backhousei Hook.f. - narrow-leaf wilsonia
Wilsonia humilis R.Br. - silky wilsonia
Wilsonia rotundifolia (Benth.) Summerh. - round-leaf wilsonia

References

Convolvulaceae
Convolvulaceae genera
Endemic flora of Australia